Allan Cosio (June 20, 1941 – April 29, 2021) was a Filipino painter, sculptor and production designer.

Career
Cosio, who was self-taught, was first noticed in the Philippine art scene during the 1970s. He started in theater as a thespian prior to becoming a set designer. He was a member of the Saturday Group of Artists.

From the 1970s to the 1980s, Cosio led the Arts Association of the Philippines as its president. His painting earned him sponsorship from the British Council and the Pollock-Krasner Foundation.

Cosio has had his works exhibited in the United States and numerous countries in Europe and Asia.

One of his known works is the Art for Peace trilogy, which won an international competition in Baghdad, Iraq.

Cosio is also a recipient of the City of Manila Award for Painting and Sculpture and the French government-bestowed Ordre des Arts et des Lettres with a grade of Chevalier.

Personal life
Cosio was married to Ivi Avellana, a former theatre actress, with whom he had two daughters.

Death
Cosio died on April 29, 2021, in his home province of Pampanga.

References

1941 births
2021 deaths
Artists from Pampanga
Filipino painters
Filipino sculptors
Chevaliers of the Ordre des Arts et des Lettres